The men's C-1 500 metres event was an open-style, individual canoeing event conducted as part of the Canoeing at the 2000 Summer Olympics program.

Medallists

Results

Heats
18 competitors were entered on 27 September. The top three finishers in both heats moved on to the final. Fourth through seventh-place finishers and the fastest eighth-place finisher advanced to the semifinal.

Overall Results Heats

Semifinal
A semifinal was held on 29 September with the top three finishers advancing to the final.

Final
The final took place on 1 October.

Kolonics, initially a C-2 canoer, moved to C-1 500 m when he and his partner Csaba Horváth failed to qualify in the Hungarian Olympic trials. His prior success in this event was a silver at the 1993 world championships, but he was able to upset then two-time defending event world champion Opalev (The Russian has won this event world championship five times as of 2008.) in the final. Before his 2008 death, Kolonics would win two more world championship silvers in the event, earning them in 2001 and 2002.

References
2000 Summer Olympics Canoe sprint results. 
Sports-reference.com 2000 C-1 500 m results.
Wallechinsky, David and Jaime Loucky (2008). "Canoeing: Men's Canadian Singles 500 Meters". In The Complete Book of the Olympics: 2008 Edition. London: Aurum Press Limited. p. 479.

Men's C-1 500
Men's events at the 2000 Summer Olympics